Fraud Squad TV is a Canadian half-hour documentary television series aimed at bringing awareness to the public about the global problem of fraud. The series premiered September 24, 2007, on Court TV Canada. The show interviews real people who have been the victims of a fraud as well as experts in the field who offer tips on how to avoid becoming a victim. The series educates and thereby protects unsuspecting victims from all sorts of scams. The show is expected to begin its second season in late 2009.

Each Fraud Squad TV episode is split into two fraud topics per episode.

Synopsis
Fraud Squad TV, hosted by Tom Hnatiw (pronounced "NA-choo"), profiles a variety of cases, and offers fraud-stopping tips to prevent the average citizen from being victimized. In each episode, victims and law enforcement officers explain how they were involved in crimes leading up to the arrests of the criminals.

Episodes
The following is taken from the order that is indicated on the Fraud Squad TV website. The original airdate order and season one DVD release order are different.

Season 1

Additional aired episodes
The following episodes aired on television but are not listed on the official website and may have included segments that have already previously aired mixed with a separate never-been-aired fraud segment.

DVD release
In July 2008, a 4-disc DVD boxset of 13 episodes of season one (Fraud Squad TV Season 1 - "Fighting Fraud Together") was released on DVD. The episode order differentiates slightly to the original airdates and episode order that is on the official website. The season one DVD episode order as follows:

 Disk One
 Promo - 2.5 minutes
 Episode 01 - Moving Fraud/Nigerian 419 Scam
 Episode 02 - Counterfeit Money/Mortgage Fraud
 Episode 03 - Charity Fraud/Investment Fraud
 Episode 04 - Travel Fraud/Advance Fee Fraud
 Disk Two
 Promo - 2.5 minutes
 Episode 05 - Home Improvement Fraud/Debit Skimming
 Episode 06 - Identity Theft/Lottery-Elderly Fraud
 Episode 07 - Employment Scam/Adoption Fraud
 Disk Three
 Promo - 2.5 minutes
 Episode 08 - Pump & Dump/Used Car Fraud
 Episode 09 - Home Improvement Fraud/Pyramid Scam
 Episode 10 - Counterfeit Products/Identity Theft Raid
 Disk Four
 Promo - 2.5 minutes
 Episode 11 - Art Auction Fraud/Marriage Fraud
 Episode 12 - Fake Credentials/Fake Certificates of Deposit
 Episode 13 - Car Insurance Fraud/Real Estate Investment Fraud

References

External links
 
 Fraud Squad TV airdates at MSN

2000s Canadian documentary television series
2007 Canadian television series debuts
2008 Canadian television series endings